The 2018–19 Maltese Second Division (known as the BOV Second Division for sponsorship reasons) is the league competition for the third-tier league in the Maltese football league system. The opening fixture was played on 5 September 2018 and the league season ended on 20 April 2019. St. George's won the championship after winning the decider against fellow promoted team, Fgura United. At the other side of the table, St. Venera Lightnings and Siggiewi were relegated.

Overview

The number of teams will remain unchanged from the previous season and therefore the league will be contested by 13 teams, including 3 teams relegated from the 2017–18 Maltese First Division season and 2 teams promoted from the 2017–18 Maltese Third Division season. The 13 teams will play a round-robin tournament whereby each team plays each one of the other teams twice, once at 'home' and once 'away'. Thus, a total of 156 matches will be played, with 24 matches played by each team.

The top two teams will be promoted to the 2019–20 Maltese First Division, while the bottom two  are relegated to the 2019–20 Maltese Third Division. The team which will place in the third position will get a second chance for promotion to the 2019–20 Maltese First Division by facing the third last-team team of the 2018–19 Maltese First Division; While the team which ends in the ante-penultimate position participates in a similar play-off against the third placed team of the 2018–19 Maltese Third Division.

As is the norm in Malta, the matches will be played at a number of venues designated by the Malta Football Association. 4 different venues were assigned for this year's competition, with the Centenary Stadium in Ta' Qali hosting the largest share of matches. In a bid of drawing more supporters to the stadiums, admission prices for the season were slashed to €2, with those for children aged under 12 years and senior citizens abolished completely.

Teams

Venues

League table

Results

Playoffs

Championship play-off 

St. George's and Fgura United finished the regular season level on points and therefore a play-off was required to decide the winner of the 2018-19 Maltese Second Division.

Promotion play-off 

A play-off match took place between the twelfth-placed team from the First Division (Vittoriosa Stars), and the third-placed team from the Second Division (Mgarr United), for a place in the 2019–20 Maltese First Division.

Relegation play-off 

A play-off match took place between the twelfth-placed team from the Second Division, (Żabbar St. Patrick), and the third-placed team from the Third Division, (Msida Saint-Joseph), for a place in the 2019–20 Maltese Second Division.

Top goalscorers 

Last updated: 27 April 2019

References

External links
 Malta Football Association

Maltese Second Division seasons
Malta
3